Amanita parvipantherina, also known as the Asian small panther amanita, is a species of agaric restricted to Yunnan province in China. It is strongly associated with the Yunnan Pine Pinus yunnanensis. It fruits in July and August.

This species is rather similar to the widespread Amanita pantherina, with a brown cap covered with whitish remnants of the universal veil, but is generally smaller (cap diameter up to 6 cm, stem length up to 9 cm) and more fragile than that species with much more prominent striations around the margin of the cap.

See also

List of Amanita species

References
 Yang ZL, Weiss M & Oberwinkler F. (2004) New species of Amanita from the eastern Himalaya and adjacent regions

parvipantherina
Fungi of Asia
Fungi described in 2004